The women's tanding 65 kg kilograms competition at the 2018 Asian Games took place from 23 to 29 August 2018 at Padepokan Pencak Silat, Taman Mini Indonesia Indah, Jakarta, Indonesia.

Schedule
All times are Western Indonesia Time (UTC+07:00)

Results
Legend
WO — Won by walkover

References

External links
Official website

Women's tanding 65 kg